David Eustace (born May 3, 1999) is an American ice sled hockey player. He was a member of the United States national team that won gold at the 2022 Winter Paralympics.

Career
Eustace made his debut with the United States national team during the 2019–20 season. He represented the United States at the 2022 Winter Paralympics and won a gold medal.

References 

1999 births
Living people
People from Stoneham, Massachusetts
American sledge hockey players
Paralympic sledge hockey players of the United States
Paralympic gold medalists for the United States
Para ice hockey players at the 2022 Winter Paralympics
Medalists at the 2022 Winter Paralympics
Paralympic medalists in sledge hockey
21st-century American people